The Philippine Senate Committee on Environment, Natural Resources and Climate Change is a standing committee of the Senate of the Philippines.

This committee was formed after the Committee on Environment and Natural Resources and the Committee on Climate Change were merged on September 3, 2019, pursuant to Senate Resolution No. 9 of the 18th Congress.

Jurisdiction 
According to the Rules of the Senate, the committee handles all matters relating to:

 Conservation and protection of the environment
 Policies, programs, strategies, technologies and other innovations addressing global warming and climate change impacts, including, but not limited to, climate risk management to reduce vulnerability associated with climate-sensitive areas and sectors, the regulation of the impact of human activities on the same, the promotion of environmental awareness of our citizens, the renewal of resources in damaged ecosystems and other environment-related issues
 Adaptation and mitigation or control of greenhouse gas emissions to enhance resilience and to promote sustainable development
 Philippine compliance with the relevant international agreements and cooperation with other countries
 Development, protection, exploration, storage, renewal, regulation and licensing, and wise utilization of the country's national reserves including, but not limited to, forest, mineral, public land, offshore areas and the development of industries based on these resources

Members, 18th Congress 
Based on the Rules of the Senate, the Senate Committee on Environment, Natural Resources and Climate Change has 17 members.

The President Pro Tempore, the Majority Floor Leader, and the Minority Floor Leader are ex officio members.

Here are the members of the committee in the 18th Congress as of September 24, 2020:

Committee secretary: Maria Clarinda R. Mendoza

See also 

 List of Philippine Senate committees

References 

Environment